A number of motor vessels have been named Focomar, including –

, a coaster in service 1972–74. Ran aground on Andros Island, Greece and sank
, a bulker in service 2011–15. Sank in the Gulf of Aden

Ship names